Ulakkai Aruvi (also referred to as Rod Falls) is a waterfall on the Western Ghats. This area is in the Asambu reserve forest, in Kanyakumari District, Tamil Nadu.

Location 
The falls are in the middle of forested hills (the hills of the Western Ghats), which is accessible by foot from the base of the hills. The hour's trek from the base of the hills is through a rocky, forested area. There are two falls - the lower falls, and the higher falls, which is further uphill. The water is spring water, coming in as a stream up from the hills nearby.

References

Nagercoil
Waterfalls of Tamil Nadu